Tracey Elizabeth "Traci" Phillips (born August 1, 1962, in Honolulu) is an American sprint canoer who competed from the late 1980s to the mid-1990s. Competing in three Summer Olympics, she earned her best finish of sixth in the K-1 500 m event at Seoul in 1988. Her Height is 5–3.5 (162 cm) and Weight is 121 lbs (55 kg)

References
 Sports-Reference.com profile

1964 births
American female canoeists
Canoeists at the 1988 Summer Olympics
Canoeists at the 1992 Summer Olympics
Canoeists at the 1996 Summer Olympics
Living people
Olympic canoeists of the United States
Sportspeople from Honolulu
Pan American Games gold medalists for the United States
Pan American Games medalists in canoeing
Canoeists at the 1987 Pan American Games
Medalists at the 1987 Pan American Games
21st-century American women